Triveni Supermarkets is a chain of retail supermarkets operating in the co-operative sector headquartered in Trivandrum, Kerala, India. This system is operated by the Kerala State Co-operative Consumers Federation Limited, which is a Public Sector undertaking in Cooperative Sector . Hence this chain is in principle used as a form of governmental intervention in the retail market in the state to control and limit retail prices. As of 2017, there are a total of 229 outlets throughout the state, including some mobile, floating supermarkets, coffeehouses and a noon meal scheme.

References 

Supermarkets of India
Companies based in Kochi
Cooperatives in Kerala
Companies with year of establishment missing